Hemiconus pissarroi is an extinct species of sea snail, a marine gastropod mollusk in the family Conidae, the cone snails.

Distribution
Fossils of this marine species were found in France.

References

External links
 Tracey S., Craig B., Belliard L. & Gain O. (2017). One, four or forty species? - early Conidae (Mollusca, Gastropoda) that led to a radiation and biodiversity peak in the late Lutetian Eocene of the Cotentin, NW France. Carnets de Voyages Paléontologiques dans le Bassin Anglo-Parisien. 3: 1-38

pissarroi
Gastropods described in 2017